Amber Allen (born October 21, 1975) is a professional Canadian soccer player. She led the Vancouver Whitecaps team in goals (23) and points (48) in the 2005. This earned her the W-League All-Conference honours.  She was named for the national squad for the 2008 Olympics, but had to drop out due to a leg injury.

References

External links
 

1975 births
Living people
Soccer people from British Columbia
Canadian women's soccer players
Canada women's international soccer players
Women's association football forwards
McGill Martlets soccer players
People from Chilliwack
Vancouver Whitecaps FC (women) players
USL W-League (1995–2015) players